The fourth municipal election in Norfolk County, Ontario, Canada took place on October 25, 2010. The incumbent (and re-elected) mayor Dennis Travale and his challenger Clarence Wheaton were the official mayoral candidates for this municipal election.

As mayor, Travale's priority was to figure out how to further expand the town of Simcoe. This could be solved by either through getting new houses built, encouraging high-tech industries to build in the area, or helping new businesses start in the Queensway/downtown business area in addition to getting high speed Internet access to communities in Norfolk County that don't already have it. Other issues that will shape the face of Norfolk County for the next four years include: helping the county rebuild its fragile economy after being affected by the national economic slowdown, the careful placement of wind generators, and the management of the Ontario tobacco belt.

This was the second election in Norfolk County history to have electronic voting in place.

Sources
 Norfolk County - 2010 Municipal Election

See also
 2006 Norfolk County municipal elections
 2003 Norfolk County municipal elections
 2000 Norfolk County municipal elections

Municipal elections in Norfolk County, Ontario
2010 Ontario municipal elections